Jim O'Neill may refer to:

 Jim O'Neill (baseball) (1893–1976), American baseball player
 Jim O'Neill, Baron O'Neill of Gatley (born 1957), British economist
 Jim O'Neil (ice hockey) (1913–1997), Canadian ice hockey player
 Jim O'Neill (investor), American investor
 Jim O'Neil (American football) (born 1978), American football coach
 Jimme O'Neill, leader of Scottish band the Silencers

See also
James O'Neill (disambiguation)